The AFL Women's season seven Rising Star award was presented to the player adjudged the best young player during AFL Women's season seven. 's Hannah Ewings won the award with 41 votes.

Eligibility
To be eligible for nomination, players must be under 21 years of age before the start of the season and not be suspended during the season.

Nominations

Final voting

References

AFL Women's season seven